Anangula Island (also called Ananiuliak Island; occasionally referred to as Kurityien Anaiuliak, Anaiuliak, Anayulyakh or Anangouliak ) is a small island in the Fox Islands group of the Aleutian Islands of southwestern Alaska.

Ancient history

During the last Pleistocene ice age, Anangula and nearby Umnak Island formed the tip of a peninsula on the southern edge of the Bering land bridge and was covered by the Cordilleran Ice Sheet that dominated the  northwestern portion of North America. This made the area unsuitable for both animal and human habitation until the ice sheet began to recede about 10-12,000 years bp. The first human settlement on Anangula (and the oldest known evidence of human activity in the Aleutians), a small village and core and blade site on the southeastern end of the island, was established about 8,400 years bp.

Recent history
Later, during the 1930s, an additional population of rabbits was established on the island to serve as food for the foxes. In the late 1940s, the foxes were removed because of their detrimental effects on the native marine bird populations, though the rabbits remain to the present.

The island gained some prominence in the archaeological community with the discovery of the core and blade site by William S. Laughlin in 1938. Later expeditions by Laughlin during the 1950s and 1960s uncovered more artifacts and a series of four expeditions in 1970-1974 unearthed the village site.

References

Fox Islands (Alaska)
Islands of Aleutians West Census Area, Alaska
Islands of Alaska
Islands of Unorganized Borough, Alaska